Grant Hagan Hermanus (born 10 November 1995 in Cape Town, South Africa) is a South African rugby union player for  in the Currie Cup and the Rugby Challenge. He can play as a fullback,flyhalf,wing.

Career

Youth

Hermanus was selected to represent  at the premier South African rugby union competition for high schools, the Under-18 Craven Week, in 2012 in Port Elizabeth. He made three appearances and scored one try in their match against South Western Districts.

Still eligible to play at Under-18 level the following year, he was once again called up to represent the Western Province team at the 2013 tournament in Polokwane, this time playing as their main kicker. He scored 45 points in three matches, consisting of twelve conversions and seven penalties. His performances also led to his inclusion in the 2013 South African Schools team. He played two matches for them; he played in their match against England, scoring an early penalty to set them on their way to a 19–14 victory. He also played in a 14–13 win over Wales eight days later.

After finishing high school, Hermanus joined the Western Province Rugby Institute in 2014. He was a member of the  side that participated in the 2014 Under-19 Provincial Championship. He made eight starts for the side during the regular season of the competition – scoring two tries in their Round Eight match against the  – to help them qualify for the semi-finals.

In April 2015, he was included in a South African Under-20 squad to tour Argentina as final preparation prior to the 2015 World Rugby Under 20 Championship: He scored a try in their 25–22 victory over Argentina in the first match and played the full 80 minutes of the second match.

Upon the team's return, he was named in the final squad for the 2015 World Rugby Under 20 Championship. He didn't feature in their match in Pool B of the competition, a 33–5 win against hosts Italy, but started their 40–8 win against Samoa and played off the bench in a 46–13 win over Australia to help South Africa finish top of Pool B to qualify for the semi-finals with the best record pool stage of all the teams in the competition. He didn't play in their semi-final match against England, which they lost 20–28 to be eliminated from the competition by England for the second year in succession, but did come on as a replacement in their third-place play-off match against France, helping South Africa to a 31–18 win to secure third place in the competition.

Western Province

Griquas

Prior to the 2019 season, Hermanus moved to Kimberley to join .

References

South African rugby union players
Living people
1995 births
Rugby union players from Cape Town
Rugby union wings
Rugby union fullbacks
Western Province (rugby union) players
South Africa Under-20 international rugby union players
Yacare XV players